Harry Wikman (1 September 1929 – 4 October 2017) was a Finnish rower. He competed in the men's eight event at the 1952 Summer Olympics.

References

1929 births
2017 deaths
Finnish male rowers
Olympic rowers of Finland
Rowers at the 1952 Summer Olympics
Sportspeople from Turku